Pea soup or split pea soup is soup made typically from dried peas, such as the split pea. It is, with variations, a part of the cuisine of many cultures. It is most often greyish-green or yellow in color depending on the regional variety of peas used; all are cultivars of Pisum sativum.

History
Pea soup has been eaten since antiquity; it is mentioned in Aristophanes' The Birds, and according to one source "the Greeks and Romans were cultivating this legume about 500 BC to 400 BC. During that era, vendors in the streets of Athens were selling hot pea soup."

Eating fresh "garden" peas before they were matured was a luxurious innovation of the Early Modern period: by contrast with the coarse, traditional peasant fare of pease pottage (or pease porridge), Potage Saint-Germain, made of fresh peas and other fresh greens braised in light stock and pureed, was an innovation sufficiently refined that it could be served to Louis XIV of France, for whose court at the Château de Saint-Germain-en-Laye it was named, c. 1660–1680.

Around the world

Australia

The pie floater is an Australian dish particularly common in Adelaide. It consists of a meat pie in a thick pea soup, typically with the addition of tomato sauce. Believed to have been first created in the 1890s, the pie floater gained popularity as a meal sold by South Australian pie carts.

A pie floater commonly consists of a traditional Australian-style meat pie, usually sitting, but sometimes submerged (traditionally upside down) in a bowl of thick pea soup made from blue boiler peas.

Britain and Ireland
A well-known nursery rhyme which first appeared in 1765 speaks of

"Pease" is the Middle English singular and plural form of the word "pea"—indeed, "pea" began as a back-formation. Pease pudding was a high-protein, low-cost staple of the diet and, made from easily stored dried peas, was an ideal form of food for sailors, particularly boiled in accompaniment with salt pork which is the origin of pea (and ham) soup. Although pease was replaced as a staple by potatoes during the nineteenth century, the food still remains popular in the national diet in the form of "mushy peas" commonly sold as the typical accompaniment to fish and chips, as well as with meat pies.

In 19th-century English literature, pea soup is referred to as a simple food and eating it as a sign of poverty. In the Thackeray short story "A Little Dinner at Timmins's", when a character asks his wife "Why don't you ask some of our old friends? Old Mrs. Portman has asked us twenty times, I am sure, within the last two years", she replies, with "a look of ineffable scorn", that when "the last time we went there, there was pea-soup for dinner!" In Thomas Hardy's Tess of the D'Urbervilles, Tess remarks that "we have several proofs that we are d'Urbervilles ... we have a very old silver spoon, round in the bowl like a little ladle, and marked with the same castle. But it is so worn that mother uses it to stir the pea-soup."

A soup of this sort made with yellow split-peas is called "London particular", after the thick yellow smogs for which London was famous until the Clean Air Act 1956.

Canada

Soupe aux pois (jaunes) (yellow pea soup) is a traditional dish in Québec cuisine. Traditional Québécois cuisine resembles early Maine and Vermont cuisines.

One source says "The most authentic version of Quebec's soupe aux pois use whole yellow peas, with salt pork, and herbs for flavour. After cooking, the pork is usually chopped and returned to the soup, or sometimes removed to slice thinly and served separately ... Newfoundland Pea Soup is very similar, but usually includes more vegetables such as diced turnips and carrots, and is often topped with small dumplings called dough boys or doughballs."

In Newfoundland, split peas are cooked in a bag as part of a Jiggs dinner, which is known as pease pudding.

Outside Francophone areas, pea soup is sometimes served with johnny cake. This is reflected in an old saying: "pea soup and johnny cake makes a Frenchman's belly ache".

Germany

Pea soup is a common dish throughout Germany. Very often, several sausages will accompany a serving of pea soup as well as some dark bread. Ready-made soup in cans is sometimes used to prepare the dish.

One of the first instant products was a pea soup product, which mainly consisted of pea meal and beef fat (: pea sausage). It was invented in 1867 by Johann Heinrich Grüneberg, who sold the recipe to the Prussian state. In 1889, the Knorr instant-food company bought the license.

Indonesia
As a former Dutch colony, Indonesia has inherited this dish as a result of Dutch–Indonesian culture, and is known as sup ercis or erwtensoep.

Netherlands

, also called , is the Dutch version of pea soup. It is a thick stew of green split peas, different cuts of pork, celeriac or stalk celery, onions, leeks, carrots, and often potato. The soup, which is traditionally eaten during the winter, is emblematic of Dutch cuisine.

It is customarily served with Frisian rye bread and bacon, cheese or butter. The bacon is usually , a variety of bacon which has been cooked and then smoked. Pancakes are sometimes served with pea soup; this dish is called ,  referring to the pancakes.

In the Royal Dutch Navy the pea soup is completed with small cubes of lard which float as white squares on top.

So-called koek-en-zopie outlets, small food and drinks stalls which spring up only during winters along frozen canals, ponds and lakes in the Netherlands and cater to ice skaters, usually serve  as a savoury snack.

In Suriname, a former Dutch colony, Dutch-style pea soup is eaten as a street food.

Nordic countries

Swedish ; Finnish ; Danish ; Norwegian .

Scandinavian pea soup is normally cooked with pork – although the meat may sometimes be served on the side – and a typical recipe would also include onions and herbs like thyme and marjoram.

In Finland the soup is made of green peas; in Sweden, Norway and Denmark yellow peas are used.

Sweden and Finland

In Sweden and Finland the soup is usually served with mustard on the side, and sometimes also with extra (dried) herbs (thyme or marjoram) to be mixed into the soup at the table. The soup is then normally followed by pancakes with jam (strawberry, raspberry, bilberry, cloudberry or similar) which are regarded more as part of the meal than as a dessert. In Sweden, the soup is sometimes accompanied by warm punsch as a special treat.

Consumption of pea soup in Sweden and Finland dates back to at least the 13th century, and is traditionally served on Thursdays. This is said to originate in the pre-Reformation era, as preparation for fasting on Fridays. The tradition of Thursday pea soup is common in restaurants, schools, military messes and field kitchens, as well as in homes, and it forms an unpretentious but well-liked part of social life.

In Finland, Laskiainen, a winter festival associated with Shrove Tuesday, is generally celebrated by eating green pea soup and either pancakes or a seasonal pastry called laskiaispulla. The celebration often includes downhill sledging.

The Swedish king Eric XIV (1533–1577) is said to have died after eating arsenic-poisoned pea soup.

Denmark
In Denmark, pea soup is served with pancakes and the mustard is scooped up with rugbrød on the side.

In Denmark the dish can be dated to 1766 in written sources, but might have originated as early as the Bronze Age, when dried peas and cabbage became popular vegetables for the long winters there.

Norway
In Norway pea soup is traditionally served at springtime and Easter, and is complemented with potatoes, carrots and vegetables.

Poland
In Poland, pea soup is typically associated with the military, where it still remains a popular dish. This is because pea soup is nutritious and cheap, and can be easily prepared in large quantities. Military pea soup is said to have to be thick enough to put a spoon straight up in it. Though the pea soup is normally prepared in messes, the dish is typically associated with field kitchens. Currently, decommissioned field kitchens are often used during mass events.

United States
In the United States, "pea soup" without qualification usually means a perfectly smooth puree. A recipe for "pea soup" from 1905 is made with split peas, salt pork and cold roast beef. The soup is strained through a sieve to achieve the desired texture.

"Split pea soup" is a slightly thinner soup with visible peas and pieces of ham, especially popular in the Northeast, the Midwest and the Pacific Northwest. It plays a role in the light-hearted tradition of serving green-colored foods on St. Patrick's Day. For example, a 1919 Boston Globe article suggests a suitable menu for "A St. Patrick's Day Dinner" leading off with "Cream of Green Pea Soup (American Style)", and continuing with codfish croquettes with green pea sauce, lettuce salad, pistachio ice cream, and "green decorated cake".

See also

 Dal
 Lentil soup
 List of legume dishes
 List of soups
 List of vegetable soups
 Marrowfat peas
 Pie floater
 Sambar (dish)

References
 Baring-Gould, William. S. and Ceil Baring-Gould (1962) The Annotated Mother Goose. (Bramhall House) [Pease porridge rhyme: dates from 1765, refers to a "thin pudding."]

External links

 The homely fare of Sweden Detailed article about the Thursday pea soup tradition

Soups
Dutch cuisine
Estonian cuisine
Karelian cuisine
Czech cuisine
Polish soups
Swedish cuisine
Finnish cuisine
Soviet cuisine
Cuisine of Quebec
Legume dishes
Canadian cuisine
Ukrainian soups
Vegetable soups
American soups
Australian soups
German soups
New Zealand soups